Tacloban, Philippines, has a variety of public and private educational institutions. Foremost of these are the University of the Philippines in the Visayas - Tacloban College, Eastern Visayas State University, the Leyte Progressive High School, a provincial branch of the Technical Education and Skills Development Authority, the Leyte Normal University, the Liceo del Verbo Divino formerly known as the Divine Word University of Tacloban and the St. Therese Educational Foundation of Tacloban, Inc. otherwise known as STEFTI.

List of schools and universities

Elementary

Public schools

 Anibong Elementary School
 Bagacay Elementary School
 Basper Elementary School
 Bayanihan Elementary School
 Bliss Elementary School
 Cabalawan Elementary School
 Caibaan Elementary School
 Camansihay Elementary School
 City Central School
 Diit Mercyville Primary School
 Don Vicente Quintero Memorial School
 Dr. A. P. Bañez Memorial School
 Fisherman's Village Elementary School
 Greendale Residences Integrated School
 Guadalupe Heights Integrated School
 Judge Antonio R. Montilla Elem. School
 Kapangian Central School
 Kapuso Village Integrated School
 Lorenzo Daa Memorial School
 Lucio Vivero Central School
 Manlurip Elementary School
 Marasbaras Central School
 New Hope Elementary School
 North Hill Arbours Integrated School
 Nula-Tula Elementary School
 Old Kawayan Elementary School
 Palanog Elementary School
 Palanog Resettlement School
 Panalaron Central School
 Rizal Central School
 RTR Primary School
 Ridgeview Park Integrated School
 Sagkahan Central School
 Salvacion Elementary School
 San Fernando Central School
 San Jose Central School
 San Roque Elementary School
 Scandinavian Elementary School
 Sta. Elena Elementary School
 Sto. Niño Elementary School
 Santo Niño SPED Center
 Tagpuro Elementary School
 Tigbao-Diit Central School
 Utap Elementary School
 V&G Dela Cruz Memorial School

Private schools

 Alpha Omega Learning Center
 Arc Angelus Civitas School, Inc.
 Asian Development Foundation
 Blessed Joseph Freinademetz Kinder
 Bright Sparks International
 CIE British School Tacloban (International School)
 Eastern Visayas College Prep. School
 Genesis Learning Institute of Eastern Visayas Inc.
 Grace Baptist Academy
 Holy Infant College
 Holy Virgin of Salvacion School, Inc.
 JE Mondejar Foundation College
 Jansen Heights Learning Foundation
 Kiddie Home Child Development Inc.
 Leyte Progressive High School
 Liceo del Verbo Divino
 Our Lady of Lourdes School foundation
 Penarada Tutorial Center
 Perpetual Help Learning Center
 Regional Continuing Educ (SPED)
 Sacred Heart College of Tacloban
 St. Agnes Educational Foundation
 St. Anthony SPED Center Foundation, Inc.
 St. Lawrence Xavier Early Academy House, Inc.
 St. Therese Educational Foundation of Tacloban, Inc.
 St. Therese Christian Development Center Foundation, Inc.
 St. Therese Educational Center of Leyte
 Tacloban Angelicum Learning Center
 Tacloban City Adventist School
 United Church Family Life Program

Secondary

Public schools

 Anibong National High School
 Anibong Night High School
 Antonio Balmes National High School
 Cirilo Roy Montejo National High School
 Cirilo Roy Montejo Night High School
 Greendale Residences Integrated School
 Guadalupe Heights Integrated School
 Kapuso Village Integrated School
 Leyte National High School
 North Hill Arbours Integrated School
 Marasbaras National High School
 Northern Tacloban City National High School
 Ridge View Park Integrated School
 San Jose National High School
 San Jose Night High School
 Sagkahan National High School
 Scandinavian National High School
 St. Francis Integrated School
 Sto. Niño Senior High School
 Tacloban City Night High School
 Tacloban National Agricultural School
 V&G National High School

Private schools

 ABE International Business College
 AMA Computer College Tacloban (currently located in nearby Palo, Leyte)
 Asian Development Foundation College
 Bethel International School
 Eastern Visayas College Preparatory School
 Grace Baptist Academy
 Holy Infant College
 Holy Virgin of Salvacion School, Inc.
 JE Mondejar Foundation College
 Leyte Progressive High School
 Liceo del Verbo Divino (formerly "Divine Word University of Tacloban")
 Sacred Heart College of Tacloban
 St. Therese Educational Center of Leyte (STECL)
 St. Therese Christian Development Center Foundation, Inc. (STCDCFI)
 St. Therese Educational Foundation of Tacloban, Inc. (STEFTI)
 Tacloban Angelicum Learning Center
 Tacloban Montessori High School

Colleges/Universities/Technical Vocational Institutes

 ABE International Business College Tacloban
 ACLC College of Tacloban
 AMA College Tacloban (currently located in nearby Palo, Leyte) 
 Asia Pacific Career College
 Asian Development Foundation College
 Colegio De La Salle Fondation de Tacloban, Inc.
 Datamex Institute of Computer Technology Tacloban City 
 Dr. Vicente Orestes Romualdez Educational Foundation (College of Law)
 Eastern Visayas State University
 Holy Infant College
 Holy Spirit Foundation College, Inc.
 Holy Virgin of Salvacion Foundation College, Inc.
 Innovate Information and Communications Technology Systems, Inc.
 JE Mondejar Foundation College
 Jose Navarro Polytechnic Institute
 Leyte Colleges
 Leyte Normal University
 Leyte Polytechnic Institute
 Leyte School of Professionals
 National Maritime Polytechnic
 Remedios Trinidad Romualdez Medical Foundation
 Sacred Heart College of Tacloban
 Saint Arnold Janssen College of Tacloban, Inc.
 Saint Paul School of Professional Studies (located in nearby Palo, Leyte)
 St. Scholastica's College, Tacloban (currently located in nearby Palo, Leyte)
 St. Benedict College of Tacloban, Inc.
 Technical Education and Skills Development Authority (TESDA) 
 University of the Philippines Visayas Tacloban College

See also

References